Haji Murad Muradi (born 29 May 1989) is an Afghan cricketer. He made his Twenty20 debut for Speen Ghar Tigers in the 2017 Shpageeza Cricket League on 17 September 2017. He made his first-class debut for Amo Region in the 2017–18 Ahmad Shah Abdali 4-day Tournament on 20 October 2017, scoring a century in both innings, albeit in a losing cause. He captained Amo Region in the final of the 2018 Ahmad Shah Abdali 4-day Tournament.

He made his List A debut for Amo Region in the 2018 Ghazi Amanullah Khan Regional One Day Tournament on 10 July 2018.

References

External links
 

1989 births
Living people
Afghan cricketers
Amo Sharks cricketers
Spin Ghar Tigers cricketers
Place of birth missing (living people)
Wicket-keepers